Stefan Mutter (born 3 October 1956) is a former professional road bicycle racer from Switzerland. He was the Swiss National Road Race champion in 1981.

Major results

1978
Giro del Mendrisiotto
1981
 National Road Race Championship
Tour Méditerranéen
1982
Leimentalrundfahrt
Vuelta a España:
Winner Points classification
7th place overall classification
Tour de France:
Winner stage 9B
1983
Zürich-Hongg
1984
Giro d'Italia
Winner stage 4

References

External links 

Official Tour de France results for Stefan Mutter

Swiss male cyclists
1956 births
Living people
Swiss Tour de France stage winners
Swiss Giro d'Italia stage winners
Sportspeople from Basel-Stadt
20th-century Swiss people